George & Tammy is an American drama television miniseries created by Abe Sylvia and directed by John Hillcoat, which premiered on Paramount Network, Showtime and CMT on December 4, 2022, with Showtime as its primary network. It stars Jessica Chastain and Michael Shannon as country music legends Tammy Wynette and George Jones, chronicling their tumultuous relationship and intertwined careers.

The series received a positive critical reception, particularly for the performances of Chastain and Shannon. For her role, Chastain received a nomination for Best Actress – Miniseries or Television Film at the 80th Golden Globe Awards and won the Screen Actors Guild Award for Outstanding Performance by a Female Actor in a Miniseries or Television Movie at the 29th Screen Actors Guild Awards.

Cast and characters
 Jessica Chastain as Tammy Wynette
 Michael Shannon as George Jones
 Steve Zahn as George Richey
 Tim Blake Nelson as Roy Acuff
 Kelly McCormack as Sheila Richey
 Katy Mixon as Jan Smith
 Robert Morgan as Pappy Daily
 Hendrix Yancey as Gwen, ages 8–10
 Walton Goggins as Earl "Peanutt" Montgomery
 David Wilson Barnes as Billy Sherrill
 John Teer as Harold Bradley
 Joshua C. Allen as Lou Bradley
 Kate Arrington as Charlene Montgomery
 Pat Healy as Don Chapel
 Bobbie Eakes as Nan Smith
 Abby Glover as Georgette Jones
 Ian Lyons as Paul Richey
GiGi Erneta as Nancy Sepulvado
 Vivie Myrick as Donna Chapel
 Zachariah Malachi as Charlie Justice
 Jamie Dick as Freddie Haws

Production

Development
In February 2016, Josh Brolin announced that he and Chastain would play George Jones and Tammy Wynette in a biographical film. In September 2020, it was announced the film would instead be a limited series, based on the book The Three of Us: Growing Up with Tammy and George by Georgette Jones, with Brolin no longer attached, instead serving as an executive producer. John Hillcoat will direct all six episodes of the series. Chastain's production company, Freckle Films is set to executive produce.

Casting
Upon the limited series announcement, Chastain was set to star as Tammy Wynette. In December 2021, it was announced that Michael Shannon was to play George Jones and Steve Zahn was to play George Richey. In January 2022, Kelly McCormack and Katy Mixon joined the cast of the series, in guest starring roles.

Filming
Principal photography began on December 8, 2021, in North Carolina.

Music
Chastain and Shannon recorded their own vocals for the show and performed them live on set. When comparing the experience to her work as Tammy Faye Bakker in The Eyes of Tammy Faye, Chastain explained that she found recording Wynette's songs more intimidating than any of Bakker's catalogue. Both actors worked with vocal coach Ron Browning for months prior to filming, with Shannon stating “These songs, they’re pretty deep and they’ve got some dark corners in them, and we spent a lot of time with them. In addition to learning how to sing them, I think they also kind of taught us about who the people were and the story we were telling.” The songs were produced by T Bone Burnett and Rachael Moore and both actors talked about how the focus was not on doing an impersonation of Jones or Wynette but of capturing certain aspects of their personality and conveying this during their performances. A soundtrack featuring songs from the show was released digitally from Sony Masterworks on December 16, 2022.

Episodes

Reception

Critical response
The review aggregator website Rotten Tomatoes reported an 84% approval rating with an average rating of 6.9/10, based on 32 critic reviews. The website's critics consensus reads, "George & Tammy may not have the staying power of the classic songs recorded by its subjects, but this biopic benefits from a pair of well-matched and supremely committed leads." On Metacritic the series holds a score of 71 based on 23 critic reviews, indicating "generally favorable reviews".

Accolades
Chastain was nominated for the Best Actress in a Miniseries or Motion Picture – Television category for 80th Golden Globe Awards.

Chastain won the Screen Actors Guild Award (SAG) for Outstanding Performance by a Female Actor in a Television Movie or Miniseries for her role in George & Tammy at the 29th edition of the ceremony.

References

External links
 

English-language television shows
2020s American drama television miniseries
2020s American music television series
2022 American television series debuts
2023 American television series endings
American biographical series
Country music television series
Cultural depictions of country musicians
Showtime (TV network) original programming
Paramount Network original programming
Television series about couples
Television shows filmed in North Carolina
Television shows filmed in Wilmington, North Carolina